Laura Donnelly (born 1982) is an actress from Northern Ireland

Laura Donnelly may also refer to:

 Laura Donnelly (Love Is a Many Splendored Thing), a character on the American soap opera Love Is a Many Splendored Thing